Sarcodon atroviridis is a species of fungus in the family Bankeraceae found in North America and Asia. It was originally described in 1895 as Hydnum atroviride by Andrew Price Morgan.  Howard James Banker transferred it to Sarcodon in 1906. The fungus is known from Asia and North America; in 2015 it was reported from Brazil. The specific epithet atroviridis means "blackish green". While not explicitly known to be poisonous, it is considered of poor edibility.

References

External links
 

Fungi described in 1895
Fungi of Asia
Fungi of North America
Fungi of Brazil
atroviridis